Seabird is an American alternative rock band from Independence, Kentucky. The band formed when Aaron Morgan, Micah Landers, and Aaron Hunt began playing songs with each other in 2004. The band soon added accordion player David Smith. After playing together for a little under a year both Landers and Smith left to pursue other interests. Soon after Chris Kubik joined the band to take the place of Landers on bass and Morgan began playing two keyboards to make up for the loss of the accordion. After adding Morgan's brother (Ryan) to play guitar, the band recorded their debut EP, Spread Your Broken Wings and Try, in one of the band members' rooms.

Their EP was passed to EMI and, after a personal showcase, the band was signed in 2005. However, a year later, the band switched from EMI to Credential Records. They continued to record material for a possible studio album from 2006 through most of 2007 and released a second EP, Let Me Go On, in mid-December 2007. This time, their second EP was used as a teaser for their upcoming debut studio album, 'Til We See the Shore, which was released on June 24, 2008. Their latest album Rocks into Rivers was released on December 15, 2009. On June 17, 2012 they completed their Kickstarter project which raised funds for a self-produced third full-length album. On May 13, 2013 the band announced the name of the Kickstarter project album to be Troubled Days with release date of July 16, 2013.

Seabird's songs were recently heard on Pushing Daisies, Numb3rs, and Grey's Anatomy. Seabird's song "Don't You Know You're Beautiful" was played at the beginning of the Ghost Whisperer Season 5 episode On Thin Ice.

Band members

Current members

 Aaron Morgan – lead vocals, keyboards
 Jason Gann – bass guitar
 Steven Bye – drums
 Ryan Morgan – guitar

Former members

 Brandon Weaver - bass guitar
 Micah Landers – bass guitar
 David Smith – accordion, keyboards
 Aaron Hunt – drums
 Chris Kubik – bass guitar

Discography

Studio albums

EPs
 Spread Your Broken Wings and Try – May 24, 2005
 Let Me Go On – December 18, 2007
 Purevolume.com Acoustic Sessions
 The Silent Night EP – November 24, 2009
 Over the Hills and Everywhere EP: A Christmas EP - October 15, 2010

Compilation appearances
X 2009 – "Rescue"

Singles
 "Rescue"
 "Not Alone"
 "Don't You Know You're Beautiful"
 "Trust"

Rare
 Live from the Vibe

References

External links

Official Facebook page
Official MySpace page
Official Pure Volume page
[ Seabird overview on Allmusic.com]
Interview with Preston Lane on Humdrum
Interview with Aaron Morgan on The Collision Podcast

Alternative rock groups from Kentucky
Credential Recordings artists
Musical groups established in 2004
Christian rock groups from Kentucky